Kenan Karišik (born 23 April 1987), is a Bosnian-Turkish footballer who plays as a midfielder for Bayrampaşaspor.

He was born in Sjenica, SFR Yugoslavia and has dual citizenship, Bosnian and Turkish.

Club career

He played with Fethiyespor in the Turkish First League, then between 2014 and 2016 he played with Şanlıurfaspor in the Turkish First League, and in 2016 he joined Akhisar Belediyespor and is playing the Turkish Super League.

References

External links
 
 

1987 births
Living people
People from Sjenica
Association football midfielders
Bosnia and Herzegovina footballers
Altınordu F.K. players
Yıldırım Bosna S.K. footballers
Nazilli Belediyespor footballers
1922 Konyaspor footballers
Fethiyespor footballers
Şanlıurfaspor footballers
Akhisarspor footballers
Samsunspor footballers
Adanaspor footballers
Bayrampaşaspor footballers
Süper Lig players
TFF First League players
TFF Second League players
TFF Third League players
Bosnia and Herzegovina expatriate footballers
Expatriate footballers in Turkey
Bosnia and Herzegovina expatriate sportspeople in Turkey